Krzysztof Andzrej Bujar (born 14 November 1961) is a Polish former ice hockey player. He played for Naprzód Janów during his career. He also played for the Polish national team at the 1992 Winter Olympics and the 1989 World Championship.

References

External links
 

1961 births
Living people
Ice hockey players at the 1992 Winter Olympics
Naprzód Janów players
Olympic ice hockey players of Poland
Polish ice hockey forwards
Sportspeople from Katowice